Thomas Oboe Lee (born September 5, 1945) is a Chinese American composer.

Life 

Lee was born in Beijing, China. His family left Communist China in 1949 and lived in Hong Kong until 1959, when he moved to São Paulo, Brazil. He emigrated to the United States in the summer of 1966.

Lee's musical education began in Brazil during the Bossa Nova craze.  He performed as a jazz flutist with many illustrious Brazilian musicians, including the singer/songwriter Chico Buarque de Hollanda.  He continued his music education in the United States at the University of Pittsburgh, the New England Conservatory of Music and Harvard University. He taught at Berklee College of Music. He has been a professor of music at Boston College, since the fall of 1990.

In 1981, Lee and five other composers from the New England Conservatory formed a composers group called "Composers in Red Sneakers."  The group produced a number of successful concerts in the Boston-Cambridge area.  Lee left the group in 1986 to live in Italy for a year when he won the 1987 Rome Prize Fellowship.

Lee's music has won many other awards and Fellowships: two Guggenheim Fellowship awards, two National Endowment for the Arts Fellowships, two Massachusetts Artists Foundation Fellowships, the 1985 Charles Ives Fellowship from the American Academy and Institute of Arts and Letters, First Prize at the 1983 Friedheim Kennedy Center Awards for his Third String Quartet ... child of Uranus, father of Zeus, and recording grants from the Martha Baird Rockefeller Fund, and the Aaron Copland Fund for Music.

Works 
Lee's work, "Morango ... Almost A Tango" was written for and recorded by the Kronos Quartet.

Recordings
Thomas Oboe Lee String Quartets –  performed by the Hawthorne String Quartet. Label: Koch International 3-7452-2-III
Thomas Oboe Lee The Visconti-Sforza Tarot Cards –  performed by the Hirsch-Pinkas Piano Duo. Label: Arsis Audio CD 148
Thomas Oboe Lee Six Concertos –  performed by the Boston Modern Orchestra Project. Label: BMOP/sound 1025

References

External links
Thomas Oboe Lee website

1945 births
20th-century classical composers
21st-century classical composers
American male classical composers
American classical composers
University of Pittsburgh alumni
New England Conservatory alumni
Harvard University alumni
Boston College faculty
Living people
Hong Kong emigrants to the United States
21st-century American composers
Hong Kong emigrants to Brazil
20th-century American composers
20th-century American male musicians
21st-century American male musicians
Pupils of Gunther Schuller